Acacia echinuliflora is a tree belonging to the genus Acacia and the subgenus Juliflorae that is native to northern Australia.

Description
It has dark brown to black coloured bark that is fibrous and shaggy. It has resinous, terete, reddish brown coloured branchlets. Like most species of Acacia it has phyllodes rather than true leaves. The evergreen, thinly coriaceous and glabrous phyllodes have a narrowly elliptic or oblanceolate shape and are straight or slightly curved. It blooms between June and August producing golden flowers. The brown or black seeds inside are arranged transversely and have an obloid or ellipsoidal shape.

Distribution
It is endemic to the Northern Territory where it is commonly found along the escarpments in the western portion of Arnhem Land in the north and down to Nitmiluk National Park in the south where it grows in sandy soils that are part of creeks and streams that are responsible for draining the escarpment.

See also
List of Acacia species

References

echinuliflora
Flora of the Northern Territory
Plants described in 1994